Dana Stevens (born October 16, 1963) is an American screenwriter and television writer/producer.

Early life
Dana grew up in Phoenix, Arizona and is a summa cum laude graduate of UCLA.

Career
She has written films including The Woman King, starring Viola Davis and directed by Gina Prince-Bythewood; Netflix hit Fatherhood, starring Kevin Hart; the adaptation of Nicholas Sparks' novel, Safe Haven, directed by Lasse Hallstrom; City of Angels, starring Nicolas Cage and Meg Ryan; For Love of the Game, directed by Sam Raimi;  Blink, directed by Michael Apted; and Life or Something Like It, starring Angelina Jolie. She was the creator and executive producer of What About Brian, an ABC television series produced by J. J. Abrams that aired for two seasons and "Reckless" on CBS.

Stevens did an uncredited rewrite on The World Is Not Enough, directed by her then-husband Michael Apted, primarily to strengthen the female characters' roles. She was the last female screenwriter involved with writing a Bond film until Phoebe Waller-Bridge provided a script polish to No Time to Die in 2019.

She is a regular advisor at the Sundance Institute writer and filmmaker labs, and serves on the final selection committee for the Academy's Nicholl's Fellowship Screenwriting Award.

Personal life
Stevens and director Michael Apted were married for 10 years before divorcing, and the couple have a son.

Writing credits

 Blink (1993) 
 City of Angels (1998)
 For Love of the Game (1999)
 The World Is Not Enough (1999) (Uncredited)
 Life or Something Like It (2002)
 What About Brian (2006-2007) (Also creator)
 Safe Haven (2013)
 Reckless (2013) (Also creator)
 Fatherhood (2021)
 The Woman King (2022)

References

External links

1963 births
Living people
Screenwriters from California
Television producers from California
American women television producers
American television writers
Writers from Whittier, California
American women screenwriters
American women television writers
20th-century American screenwriters
20th-century American women writers
21st-century American screenwriters
21st-century American women writers